Toyota Motor Corporation's RC family is a family of 6-speed RWD/4WD transmissions. The RC transmission uses an output reduction method to achieve a compact construction. A double overdrive (5th and 6th gears) is used. A multi-cone synchromesh mechanism is used for 1st, 2nd, and 3rd gears to improve shift feel. Similar in some aspects to the older RA transmission, the RC features a separate clutch housing and uses a steel release bearing sleeve to improve serviceability and service life.

RC60
A 2WD transmission.

Ratios:
 First Gear: 4.784:1
 Second Gear: 2.423:1
 Third Gear: 1.443:1
 Fourth Gear: 1.00:1
 Fifth Gear: 0.777:1
 Sixth Gear: 0.643:1
 Reverse: 4.066:1

Applications (calendar years):
 Toyota Hilux (2.4L 2WD diesel models, GUN122/135, from 2015)
 Toyota Fortuner (2.4L 2WD diesel models, GUN165, from 2015)

RC60J
A 2WD remote cable-shift type transmission.

Ratios:
 First Gear: 4.784:1
 Second Gear: 2.423:1
 Third Gear: 1.443:1
 Fourth Gear: 1.00:1
 Fifth Gear: 0.777:1
 Sixth Gear: 0.643:1
 Reverse: 4.066:1

Applications (calendar years):
 Toyota HiAce (1GDFTV 2.8L diesel, GDH300/301/320/321/322/328; and 7GR 3.5L  gas models, GRH300/301/320/321/322, from 2019)

RC60F
A 4WD transmission.

Ratios:
 First Gear: 4.784:1
 Second Gear: 2.423:1
 Third Gear: 1.443:1
 Fourth Gear: 1.00:1
 Fifth Gear: 0.777:1
 Sixth Gear: 0.643:1
 Reverse: 4.066:1

Applications (calendar years):
 Toyota Hilux (2.4L 4WD diesel models, GUN125, from 2015).
 Toyota Fortuner (2.4L 2WD diesel models, GUN165, from 2015)

RC61
A 2WD transmission.

Ratios:
 First Gear: 4.784:1
 Second Gear: 2.423:1
 Third Gear: 1.443:1
 Fourth Gear: 1.00:1
 Fifth Gear: 0.826:1
 Sixth Gear: 0.643:1
 Reverse: 4.066:1

Applications (calendar years):
 Toyota Hilux (2.5L, KUN135; 2.8L, GUN136; and 3.0L, KUN136, 2WD diesel models from 2015)
 Toyota Fortuner (2.8L 2WD diesel models, GUN165, from 2015)

RC61F

A 4WD transmission.

Ratios:
 First Gear: 4.784:1
 Second Gear: 2.423:1
 Third Gear: 1.443:1
 Fourth Gear: 1.00:1
 Fifth Gear: 0.826:1
 Sixth Gear: 0.643:1
 Reverse: 4.066:1

Applications (calendar years):
 Toyota Hilux (2.5L, KUN125; 2.8L, GUN126; and 3.0L, KUN126, 4WD diesel models from 2015)
 Toyota Fortuner (2.8L, GUN156; and 3.0L, KUN156, 4WD diesel models from 2015)

RC62F
A 4WD transmission.

Ratios:
 First Gear: 3.982:1
 Second Gear: 2.017:1
 Third Gear: 1.321:1
 Fourth Gear: 1.00:1
 Fifth Gear: 0.848:1
 Sixth Gear: 0.713:1
 Reverse: 3.385:1

Applications (calendar years):
 Toyota Tacoma (3.5L 4WD V6 models, GRN305, from 2015)

RC